Epinnula is a genus of fish in the family Gempylidae.

References

Gempylidae
Scombriformes
Fish genera
Taxa described in 1854
Taxa named by Felipe Poey